The De Queen Formation, formerly known as the DeQueen Limestone Member is a Mesozoic geological formation located in southwestern Arkansas and southeastern Oklahoma in the United States. Fossil sauropod and theropod tracks have been reported from the formation. It preserves fossils dating back to the Cretaceous period, particularly the Albian age.

See also

 List of fossiliferous stratigraphic units in Arkansas
 List of dinosaur-bearing rock formations
 List of stratigraphic units with sauropodomorph tracks
 Sauropod tracks
 Paleontology in Arkansas

Footnotes

References
 
 Weishampel, David B.; Dodson, Peter; and Osmólska, Halszka (eds.): The Dinosauria, 2nd, Berkeley: University of California Press. 861 pp. .

Albian Stage
Cretaceous Arkansas
Ichnofossiliferous formations